Juan Manuel Carreras López (born 24 April 1962) is a Mexican politician from the Institutional Revolutionary Party. From 2000 to 2003 he served as Federal Representative at the LVIII Legislature of the Mexican Congress representing the State of San Luis Potosí. Also, he served as Secretary of Education in the State of San Luis Potosí.

In January 2015 he was designated by the PRI Party as candidate for Governor of San Luis Potosí. Later, he won the elections and he was sworn as State Governor on September 26, 2015 for a six-year term.

He has more than 68,000 followers on Twitter.

References

1962 births
Living people
People from San Luis Potosí City
Governors of San Luis Potosí
Institutional Revolutionary Party politicians
21st-century Mexican politicians
Politicians from San Luis Potosí
Escuela Libre de Derecho alumni
National Autonomous University of Mexico alumni